IT grade(s) refer to an internationally accepted code system for tolerances on linear dimensions.  Such code systems may be used to produce interchangeable parts. In engineering, the word tolerance refers to a range of allowable dimensions or values.    Standard tolerance grades are a group of tolerances for linear sizes characterized by a common identifier.   For SI measurements, a system of tolerance grades defined in ISO 286 is frequently used and identified by the letters IT followed by a number specifying how precise the requirements are, relative to the nominal size of a part.   

For example, IT14 refers to a group of tolerances used in manufacturing.   For a part dimensioned at 10 mm, IT14 allows for up to 0.36 mm of variation in size.  As the IT grade number increases, the tolerances increase; similarly, for larger nominal sizes, the standard tolerances increase.   For a part dimensioned at 100 mm, IT14 allows for up to 0.87 mm of variation in size.

Definition

The ISO 286 defines the international tolerances grades for nominal sizes up to 3.15 meters as follows:

From IT6 to IT18, the standard tolerances are multiplied by the factor 10 at each fifth step. This rule applies to
all standard tolerances and may be used to extrapolate values for IT grades not given in Table 1.  For example, the nominal size range 120 mm up to and including 180 mm, the value of IT20 is:

    IT20 = IT15 × 10 = 1.6 mm × 10 = 16 mm 

IT grades may be used with alternate prefixes which identify how the tolerance limits are distributed around a nominal value.   When used with the IT prefix, IT grades do not specify how the tolerance limits are placed around the nominal value, alternate prefixes are used for this purpose.   For example, if the tolerance limits are distributed symmetrically above and below the nominal value, the prefix "js" may be used.  For example a part dimensioned (in millimeters) as 4 js7 is equivalent to 4 ± 0.006 (where 4 IT7 is 0.012.)  

Other standardized prefixes include the letters A, B, C, CD, D, E, EF, F, G, H, J, K, M, N, P, R, S, T, U, V, X, Y, Z, ZA, ZB, ZC (for holes), and the lower-case equivalents (for shafts.)   Prefix letters I, L, O, Q and W are not used to avoid confusion.   Of these, the letter prefixes H and h are easiest to explain as the tolerance lies entirely on one side of the nominal size.  A hole dimensioned at 4 H7 may range from 4.00 - 4.012 mm, and a shaft at 4 h7 may range from 3.988 - 4.00 mm.

Preferred tolerance classes and fits

ISO 286 identifies a set of preferred tolerance classes for holes which include G7, H7, JS7, K7, N7, P7, R7, S7, F8, H8, E9, H9, D10, A11, B11, C11, and H11.  The set of preferred tolerance classes for shafts includes g6, h6, js6, k6, n6, p6, r6, s6, f7, h7, e8, d9, h9, a11, b11, c11 and h11.   

To completely specify the fit between a hole and corresponding shaft, it is common to specify a pair of the above tolerance classes, for example H7/g6.   As with all IT grades, the smaller numbers correspond to tighter tolerances.  Under normal circumstances, only a small number of the possible fits are practically required, and ISO 286 identifies preferred fit combinations including these as most preferred:

Other uses

An industrial process may have an IT grade associated with it, indicating how precise it is. When designing a part, an engineer will typically determine a critical dimension (D) and some tolerance (T) on that dimension. Using this formula, the engineer can determine what IT Grade is necessary to produce the part with those specifications. Thus, if injection molding has is IT13 and a part requires IT5, one cannot use injection molding to produce that part to those specifications. It is useful in determining the processes capable of producing parts to a specification.

See also
Manufacturing
Interference fit
Process capability

References

External links
ISO Hole and Shaft tolerances/limits, Roymech, UK.
ISO Hole and Shaft Tolerances iPhone App, Trelleborg Sealing Solutions Germany.

Mechanical standards